The 2018 FIA World Touring Car Cup (known as the FIA WTCR presented by Oscaro for sponsorship reasons) was the inaugural season of the World Touring Car Cup (WTCR). It took over from the World Touring Car Championship and adopted the TCR technical regulations. It was also the 14th overall season of the series that dates from the 2005 World Touring Car Championship. The change of name and new rules follow the declining interest in the TC1 regulations used by the World Touring Car Championship between 2014 and 2017 and the growing interest among manufacturers in the TCR touring car category.

Teams and drivers

Team and driver changes
 As the new WTCR regulations do not allow factory teams, Polestar Cyan Racing will not take part in the new series. Thus Nick Catsburg and Néstor Girolami left the team with Girolami returning to Super TC 2000 Championship and Catsburg joining BMW to race in the FIA World Endurance Championship. Development driver Yvan Muller, who competed as one-off entry last season, formed Yvan Muller Racing with 2017 WTCC champion Thed Björk with the team using the Hyundai i30 N TCR for the season.
 Norbert Michelisz left Honda Racing Team JAS to join BRC Racing Team in the second Hyundai i30 N TCR. He'll be joined by Gabriele Tarquini, who had competed with the team in the 2017 TCR International Series in the final two rounds of the season.
 Sébastien Loeb Racing will enter two Volkswagen Golf GTI TCR cars for the 2018 season for Robert Huff, who raced the previous season for ALL-INKL.COM Münnich Motorsport in WTCC and Leopard Racing Team WRT in partial TCR International Series campaign, and Mehdi Bennani. With the decision to sign Huff and keep Bennani 2017 WTCC Trophy winner Tom Chilton left the team to compete in the British Touring Car Championship with Motorbase Performance. Chilton had participated in both WTCC and BTCC in 2017 before announcing that he would be competing in BTCC only.
 After competing in the final two races of the 2017 TCR International Series season, TCR BeNeLux regular Denis Dupont would make his full-time début with Comtoyou Racing. He will be partnered by Aurélien Panis, who made appearances in both WTCC with Zengő Motorsport and TCR International Series with Boutsen Ginion Racing. The team later announced that they would expand to 4 cars adding Frédéric Vervisch and Nathanaël Berthon. In accordance with team size regulations, Vervisch and Dupont will enter under the entry Audi Sport Team Comtoyou, scoring separately from Comtoyou Racing. With these announcements double TCR International Series overall winner Stefano Comini left the team.
 Boutsen Ginion Racing will switch to the new Honda Civic Type R TCR (FK8) for the 2018 season. Former Honda Racing Team JAS driver Tiago Monteiro will drive one of the cars. He will drive alongside Tom Coronel joining from ROAL Motorsport. On 26 March Benjamin Lessennes, the 2017 TCR BeNeLux Touring Car Championship winner with the team, was announced as replacement for Monteiro for the first rounds of the season as Monteiro was not medically cleared. Lessennes was already signed as the team's test and developmental driver prior to the decision.
 ALL-INKL.COM Münnich Motorsport entered three Honda Civic Type R TCR (FK8) for Esteban Guerrieri, who comes from Honda Racing Team JAS, Yann Ehrlacher, who moves from RC Motorsport, and at selected races for James Thompson, who last raced for Lada Sport in the 2015 World Touring Car Championship. Guerrieri and Ehrlacher are nominated by the team to score points in the teams' championship.
 Craft-Bamboo Racing will move to TCR Europe for 2018 with a two-car entry with the car which will they run is yet to be announced. Pepe Oriola moved to Campos Racing, while James Nash returned to the British Touring Car Championship with BTC Norlin Racing.
 W Racing Team (competing under the guise of Leopard Racing Team WRT), will switch from Volkswagen Golf GTI TCR to Audi RS 3 LMS TCR competing under the Audi Sport Leopard Lukoil Racing banner for sponsorship reasons. 2017 TCR International Series drivers' winner Jean-Karl Vernay and Gordon Shedden, who has competed for the team in Dubai, will drive the two cars. 2017 DTM champion René Rast will make one-off appearance for the team (as Audi Sport Team WRT) at the Nordschleife as wildcard entrant
 M1RA, the 2017 TCR International Series teams' champions, will move to the TCR Europe Series replacing the Honda Civic Type R TCR for Hyundai i30 TCR. Dániel Nagy will drive one of the cars, moving from Zengő Motorsport. Attila Tassi, who finished as runner-up in the drivers' standings, will leave the team becoming JAS Motorsport's test driver and will drive a Honda Civic Type R TCR (FK8) in TCR Europe Series for KCMG. Both Nagy and Tassi made one-off appearances as wildcard entrants in Hungary.
 DG Sport Compétition switched from Opel Astra TCR to Peugeot 308 TCR and retained Maťo Homola and Aurélien Comte.
 Romeo Ferraris signed Fabrizio Giovanardi, who returns to full-time competition after last competing in the 2014 British Touring Car Championship, and Gianni Morbidelli, who competed for WestCoast Racing in the 2017 TCR International Series season. With these announcements Dušan Borković and Davit Kajaia will leave the team with Borković set to drive in the TCR Europe Series for Target Competition.
 After competing with Sébastien Loeb Racing in 2017, John Filippi returned to his previous team Campos Racing driving a Cupra León TCR.

Calendar

The 2018 championship was contested over thirty rounds in Europe, Africa and East Asia.

A provisional calendar was released in December 2017. In March 2018 an additional round in China was added at the Wuhan Street Circuit.

Rule changes

Sporting regulations
 With titles for drivers and teams only the new series will receive "World Cup" rather than "World Championship" status. Manufacturers will be able to develop cars for competition that are then sold to privateer entrants and will also be allowed to provide ongoing support and development to those teams.
 The WTCR series will be capped at 26 entries with up to two wildcards nominated by the organizers at each race weekend. The entry cap will be in place for all races except for Macau where six wildcards were nominated. All Teams will have to enter a minimum two cars with an entry fee of 150,000 Euro.
 The weekend format was also changed. Now there are three races per weekend instead of two with the first race being held on Saturdays with its own 30-minute qualifying session right after the two Free Practice sessions. On Sundays there is going to be another qualifying session to determine the grid for Race 3, while Race 2's starting grid will have the Top 10 drivers from the session in reverse order. 
 The tires will be supplied by Yokohama and the fuel by Panta.

Results

Championship standings

Drivers' championship
Championship points were awarded on the results of each race at each event as follows:

(key)

Teams' championship

(key)

References

Notes

External links

 

2018
World Touring Car Cup
World Touring Car Cup